María Olvido Gara Jova (born 13 June 1963), better known as Alaska, is a Spanish-Mexican singer famous in Spain and Hispanic America. She was one of the founding members of the La Movida Madrileña, the cultural and artistic movement that followed the end of Francoist Spain. This movement, in which music, the arts, cinema and fashion erupted and collided to show what Spain had become under Franco. She has participated, since the late 1970s, in several music groups: Kaka de Luxe 1977, Alaska y los Pegamoides 1980, Alaska y Dinarama 1983, and since 1989, the Spanish electropop band, Fangoria. Today, Alaska continues to perform and has become an icon of 1980s Spain.

Life and career

Early life 
Alaska was born in Mexico City on 13 June 1963. Her father, from Asturias, Spain, was in Mexico living in exile during the Spanish Civil War along with her Cuban mother, who was also living in Mexico in exile from Fidel Castro. In 1973, two years before caudillo Francisco Franco died, her parents decided to move to Spain, settling in Madrid.

Alaska was a big fan of artists such as Lou Reed and T-Rex, but David Bowie was her biggest influence. She even told her mother that she would love to be a boy just so he could be gay.

At 14 she collaborated translating Robert Crumb's comic strips for a fanzine called Bazofia, using the pen name Alaska. She chose the name inspired by the lyrics of Reed's song "Caroline Says II" ("All her friends call her Alaska"/../"It's so cold in Alaska").

The birth of punk also had a big influence on the young Alaska, who soon decided to form a band. She went to El Rastro, a famous flea market in Madrid, looking for band members, where she met Nacho Canut and Carlos Berlanga.

1970s and 1980s 

In 1977, Alaska along with Fernando Márquez, Nacho Canut, Carlos Berlanga and Enrique Sierra, among others, formed the band Kaka de Luxe, one of the first Spanish punk rock bands, where she played rhythm guitar. In 1979, Gara, Canut, Berlanga, Ana Curra and Eduardo Benavente formed the band Alaska y los Pegamoides. Alaska was lead singer for the first time with the group "Pegamoides". They took the name as a tribute to one of the bands they admired: Siouxsie and the Banshees. Due to some artistic differences, Carlos Berlanga left "Pegamoides", and with Nacho Canut they formed "Dinarama". At this time, Eduardo Benavente and Ana Curra were involved in Parálisis Permanente, one of the first goth bands in Spain. A few months after Carlos Berlanga left the band, "Pegamoides" split up. In 1982, Alaska joined "Dinarama" and the band released their first album in 1983 titled Canciones Profanas under the name Dinarama + Alaska. The band decided to use the name "Alaska y Dinarama" in their following album, Deseo carnal, and they kept the name until 1989. In 1989, Carlos Berlanga left "Alaska y Dinarama" in the middle of their tour of their last album Fan Fatal where all songs are tribute to the bands they loved and admired over the years: Ramones, Siouxsie and the Banshees, Michael Jackson, Depeche Mode, Aviador Dro, Parálisis Permanente, etc.

When "Alaska y Dinarama" split up, Nacho Canut and Alaska decide to call themselves "Fangoria". They changed their music style to electronic pop, in the style of Pet Shop Boys. They released their first album Salto Mortal with Hispavox, their record company since forming "Pegamoides". After that they left the company and released a trilogy with different independent companies: Un día cualquiera en Vulcano I, Un día cualquiera en Vulcano II and Un día cualquiera en Vulcano III. They did not play many concerts. It was during this period that Alaska became an icon for the LGBT community and became very active supporting Madrid Gay Pride.

Subterfuge, an important indie company released Fangoria's next album: Una Temporada en el Infierno, considered by some to be a masterpiece of electronic music. Fangoria started selling loads of CDs and the band became very popular. Another album with Subterfuge, Naturaleza muerta proved that Fangoria was an amazing electronic band and that Alaska was a fantastic performer. Some creative differences with Subterfuge forced Fangoria to leave its new recording label. In 2004, DRO (Warner) released their next album: Arquitectura Efímera.

In the late 1980s, Alaska was the host of a Spanish children's show on Televisión Española called La Bola de Cristal.

21st century 
In 2006, Fangoria visited Mexico to promote their new album El Extraño Viaje. Alaska appeared on two sketches of Telehit's Desde Gayola (a Mexican parody show). In the first sketch, she appeared as herself in an interview with Tesorito, in the second one, she played the character of Galaxia (a DJ) with Supermana, Chef Ornica & Manigüis.

Since 2011, she starred as herself in the MTV Spain reality series Alaska y Mario, alongside her husband/manager Mario Vaquerizo.

Collaborations with other artists 
In 1980, Alaska appeared as Bom in the Pedro Almodóvar film Pepi, Luci, Bom y otras chicas del montón. She has also had cameo roles in films like Airbag, Más que amor, frenesí, etc.

Alaska has collaborated on the soundtracks of The Killer Tongue (La Lengua Asesina) with Robert Englund, The Bear Cub (Cachorro), Bandid Lover (Amante Bandido) in Miguel Bosé's Papito (2007), etc.

Reception 
American academic and social critic, Camille Paglia, discovered Fangoria's music video "El Cementerio De Mis Sueños" ("The Cemetery of My Dreams") thanks to a reader of her column on www.salon.com, and had the following to say about Alaska in her column dated 10 January 2008:

Discography

Kaka de Luxe 
 Kaka de Luxe (1978)
 Kaka de Luxe/Paraíso (1982)
 Las canciones malditas (1983)

Alaska y Los Pegamoides 
 Grandes Éxitos (1982)
 Alaska y Los Pegamoides (1982)
 Llegando hasta el final (1982)
 Mundo Indómito (1998)

Alaska y Dinarama 
 Canciones Profanas (1983)
 Deseo carnal (1984)
 No es pecado (1986)
 Diez (1988)
 Fan fatal (1989)

Fangoria 
 "Salto mortal" (1992)
 "Un Dia Cualquiera En Vulcano" (Super Extended Play 1.0) (1992)
 "Un Dia Cualquiera En Vulcano" (Super Extended Play 2.0) (1993)
 "Un Dia Cualquiera En Vulcano" (Super Extended Play 3.0) (1995)
 Interferencias (1998)
 Una temporada en el infierno (1999)
 Naturaleza muerta (2001)
 Arquitectura efímera (2004)
 El extraño viaje (2006)
 "Entre Punta Cana Y Monte Carlo" (2008)
 Absolutamente (2009)
 El paso transcendental del vodevil a la astracanada (2010)
 "Policromía" (2013)
 "Cuatricromía" (2012)
 "Canciones para robots románticos" (2016)
 "Pianissimo" (2017)
 "Extrapolaciones y dos preguntas 1989–2000 (2019)
 "Extrapolaciones y dos respuestas 2001–2019 (2019)
 "Existencialismo Pop" (2021)
 "Edificaciones Paganas" (2022)

Notes

References

External links 

Blog

1963 births
Living people
20th-century Mexican women singers
21st-century Mexican women singers
Mexican LGBT rights activists
Spanish LGBT rights activists
Mexican emigrants to Spain
Mexican people of Cuban descent
Mexican people of Spanish descent
Rock en Español musicians
Singers from Mexico City
Spanish people of Cuban descent